Kye  is a common variant of the names Kai, Kay or Kyle. Kye also occurs, via numerous spellings, in many languages. For example, "sea" in Hawaiian, and "narrow" or "slender" in Celtic. The name may refer to:

Kye Allums (born 1989), American transgender advocate
Kye Fleming (born 1951), American singer/songwriter
Kye Palmer (born 1962), American trumpet player 
Kye Petersen (born 1990), Canadian skier
Kye Sones (born 1982), British musician
Kye Stewart (born 1985), Canadian football player
Kye Whyte (born 1999), British BMX racer

References

English-language unisex given names